John Goodman (born 14 February 1937) is an Australian sprinter. He competed in the men's 400 metres at the 1956 Summer Olympics.

References

1937 births
Living people
Athletes (track and field) at the 1956 Summer Olympics
Australian male sprinters
Olympic athletes of Australia
Place of birth missing (living people)